Olga Jensch-Jordan (née Jordan, 13 March 1913 – 13 February 2000) was a German diver who specialized in the 3-meter springboard. In this event she won the European title in 1931 and 1934, and competed at the 1932 and 1936 Summer Olympics, finishing fourth and fifth, respectively.

Her future husband, Dr. Arthur Jensch, was the vice Chef de Mission of Germany at the 1932 Olympics. During World War II he fought as an SS stormtrooper and was killed in action in 1945 near Berlin.

After retiring from competitions, Jensch-Jordan became a renowned diving coach. In 1948 she co-founded the German Sports Federation and in 1951 the National Olympic Committee of East Germany. Her son-in-law Hans-Dieter Pophal also became an Olympic diver.

References

External links
 

1913 births
2000 deaths
German female divers
Olympic divers of Germany
Divers at the 1932 Summer Olympics
Divers at the 1936 Summer Olympics
Sportspeople from Nuremberg
20th-century German women